The humanitarian response to the 2004 Indian Ocean earthquake of a magnitude of 9.1 was prompted by one of the worst natural disasters of modern times. On 26 December 2004, the earthquake, which struck off the northwest coast of the Indonesian island of Sumatra, generated a tsunami that wreaked havoc along much of the rim of the Indian Ocean. Particularly hard-hit were the countries of Indonesia, India, Sri Lanka and Thailand. About 230,000 people were killed, tens of thousands more were injured, and 1.7 million became homeless and displaced.

Contributing countries and supra-national organizations 
Asian expatriates, governments, humanitarian organisations and individuals around the world arrived, eager to offer aid and technical support.  Such was the global scope of the disaster that the International Charter on Space and Major Disasters was activated in quick succession by the French Civil Protection Agency, the Indian space agency ISRO, and by UNOOSA on behalf of UNOPS, thus providing a wide variety of humanitarian satellite imagery to aid and rescue organisations.  The World Bank initially estimated the amount of aid needed
at US$5 billion. Although numerous countries provided help for relief and assistance, the UN criticised both the US and Europe for providing inadequate resources. By 1 January 2005 over US$1.8 billion (£1bn) had been pledged.

In wake of the disaster, Australia, India, Japan and the United States formed a coalition to coordinate aid efforts to streamline immediate assistance. However, at the Jakarta Summit on 6 January 2005, the coalition transferred responsibilities to the United Nations.

Criticism of donor response 
Throughout the entire period of the main response to the tsunami disaster – from December 2004 for the next four or five years – there was much debate about both the size and form of way that assistance was delivered.  For example, just one day after the tsunami, on 27 December 2004, UN Undersecretary-General for Humanitarian Affairs Jan Egeland reportedly categorised the contributions of rich countries as "stingy". This was widely misinterpreted in the media as categorising the overall response to the tsunami whereas Mr Egeland later explained that at the time he had been making a general remark about overall global aid flows in recent years. Speaking at a press conference later Mr. Egeland said, "It has nothing to do with any particular country or the response to this emergency. We are in early days and the response has so far been overwhelmingly positive". The U.S. government, led by President George W. Bush and Secretary of State Colin Powell, added another US$20 million on 28 December to the original U.S pledge of US$15 million, bringing the total up to US$35 million (not including direct aid rendered by naval vessels dispatched to the region). Initially, the U.S. Navy dispatched P-3C Orion patrol aircraft and an aircraft carrier to assist with relief operations.

On 31 December the US pledge was increased tenfold to US$350 million, with President Bush saying that that amount would probably increase further. President Bush also signed a decree ordering flags to be flown at half-mast during the first week of the new year.

During the early period of the response to the tsunami, concerns were voiced in various quarters that the international relief effort might falter if nations did not honour their initial pledges. On 3 January 2005, UN Secretary-General Kofi Annan urged donor nations to ensure that their pledges were fully honoured, pointing to previous cases where "we got lots of pledges, but we did not receive all the money".

On 5 January, as countries jockeyed to make large donations, Jan Egeland said, "I'd rather see competitive compassion than no compassion", adding that too many countries were making pledges without any guarantee that the funds would arrive. Following the earthquake the previous year in Iran in Bam which killed 26,000 people, Iranian officials claimed to have received just US$17.5 million of the US$1 billion originally pledged. In mid-March 2005, the Asian Development Bank reported that the provision of over US$4 billion in aid promised by governments was behind schedule. Sri Lanka criticised the nations and organisations that clamoured to pledge donations, "Not a penny had come through yet. We are doing the relief work with our government money. Sri Lanka is still waiting for the money pledged by the donors. Money pledged by the people has been pledged to the NGOs."

Sri Lanka's Foreign Minister, Lakshman Kadirgamar, stated in a BBC interview, "A lot of aid what has been coming in latterly is I'm afraid – I'm sorry to say – not very useful. For instance there was a container full of teddy bears. They're obviously given with good will, nobody says no to that." The patience of tsunami affected nations was being stretched: "Now the government had worked out a scheme that until 26 April everything that has come, everything that will be on the seas will be admitted tax free. After that, no!". Kadirgamar went on to say, "For instance we do not need rice, we are expecting a bumper harvest, anyone who sends rice is wasting their time and money."

Many commentators claim excessive and competitive donor responses threaten less dramatic but equally important relief efforts elsewhere. "While everyone opens up their coffers for these disasters, the ongoing toll from malaria, AIDS and tuberculosis is much larger than these one-time events", said Enriqueta Bond, president of the US Burroughs Wellcome Fund. "We would do more good to invest in prevention and good public-health measures such as clean water". Tony Blair, the British prime minister, also expressed concern that tsunami aid could detract from other pressing development needs. He pointed out that there was a disaster comparable to a "preventable tsunami every week in Africa", where 10,000 people die daily from AIDS and malaria alone.

Criticism of recipient response 
In the early stages, before the extent of the disaster was clear, Sri Lanka refused Israel's offers of aid, objecting to the inclusion of 60 Israeli soldiers in the 150-person mission planned by Israel's army, to set up field hospitals, including internal medicine and paediatric clinics, an Israeli army spokesman reported to BBC. Later, the Israeli humanitarian organization sent a jumbo jet carrying 18.5 tonnes of supplies to Colombo, however, and a rescue-and-recovery team from the Jewish ultra-Orthodox organization ZAKA arrived in Colombo with equipment used for identifying bodies, as well as body bags.
Corruption, bureaucracy and nationalism hampered the humanitarian response in Indonesia.

In Sri Lanka, only 30% of those eligible affected by the tsunami as of 10 February had received any aid, and there were allegations of local officials giving aid only to their supporters, some of whom were not victims of the tsunami. The Sri Lankan government has set up a "Special Complaint Unit" for citizens to record grievances.

List of donors 
The following table is a partial listing of cash commitments from various governments and nongovernmental organisations, taken from and other sources:

Note: Exchange rates were taken on 8 January 2005, when €1 = US$1.30585; GBP 1 = US$1.87110; CAD 1 = US$0.811853; AUD 1 = US$0.757346; HKD 1 = US$0.1282; 1 INR= US$0.0228102; 1 CNY= 0.120831; 1 NOK = US$0.158526; 1 DKK = 0.175711; 1 SEK = US$0.144363; and 1 CHF = US$0.844131.

Pledged amounts as percentages of GDP 
The table below examines the amounts pledged for humanitarian efforts in light of rough national economic power, which is arguably a more useful measure. There are a number of caveats that should be kept in mind while reading the table:
 The figures do not include the cost of operating military resources deployed to provide aid, and it is unclear how this should be quantified. While some would argue that military resources are already paid for and that the relief effort can be regarded as a logistics training exercise, the increased operational costs are an unbudgeted expenditure. Others would argue that the military resources provide the only infrastructure that will deliver aid in a timely manner to save lives to the hardest hit and neediest areas, and without this quickly deployable infrastructure the other contributions, no matter how large would be useless or arrive too late.
 The figures do not tell anything about the rate in which the money will be spent. How much of the money is going to be spent this year and how much is reserved for long-term reconstructions efforts is not reflected by this table.
 Use of gross domestic product or gross national product should be treated with caution as this does not accurately measure a country's ability to provide aid. Similarly, whether to use 'nominal' or 'real' GNP/GDPs can be argued. Some GDP/GNP figures are also out of date e.g. for the year 2002, or even 2001, so comparisons between countries may not be for the same time period. A better comparison might be used by examining purchasing power parity-adjusted GDP/GNP figures (as used in the CIA factbook).
 It can be argued, the quality of aid differs as "aid" is an ambiguous term that may cover a wide variety of methods, including 'soft' loans (where the money has to be repaid with interest albeit at below market rates), and 'tied aid' (where the money has to be spent buying goods and services from the donating country). The terms by which the aid is accepted play a large role in determining how useful it is and also affect the relative cost to the donating country.
 This is aid for one particular disaster. Without knowing how much aid the various countries and their people donate to other disasters, one cannot draw conclusions on their overall level of generosity.
 The numbers below are the pledged contributions. Arguably, only funds that are actually transferred should be counted. For example, after the Bam earthquake in December 2003, the Iranian government received only US$17.5 million from the US$1 billion of international donations that had been promised.
The amounts pledged by individual sovereign nations within the European Union should be increased by amounts pledged by the European Union itself.
With all the caveats in mind, the following table lists some countries in order of nominal aid donated divided by GDP.

Pledged amounts on a per capita basis 
– Another way of looking at the figures.

Asia and Oceania

Europe

Middle East and Africa

Americas

Contributing non-governmental organisations (NGOs) 
The income of non-governmental organisations and multilateral organisations is derived from many sources, including earned revenues, grants, philanthropic donors, corporations, governments and other groups. For example, the African Union's contribution is financed by its member states. The following "contributions" may be viewed as either a diversion of funds originally earmarked for other purposes or increased donations to the contributing organisation.

Contributing corporations 

Fundraising events 
There were numerous large-scale fundraising events with hundreds of participants around the world.

World Cricket Tsunami Appeal 

Two of the nations most affected by the tsunami, India and Sri Lanka, are leading cricket-playing nations. The International Cricket Council has launched the World Cricket Tsunami Appeal to raise funds for the humanitarian effort. The highlight of this was a two-match One Day International series between a World XI and an Asian XI.

It has been reported on Cricinfo that the first of these matches raised A$8.4 million.

Other matches, such as those in late January 2005 between the New Zealand national team and a World XI also had fundraising as a primary aim.

Other events 
MTV Asia Aid by MTV Thailand for tsunami victims.
Australia Unites: Reach Out To Asia, a simulcast telethon.
UK Radio Aid, a fundraising radio show on over 200 British stations
Tsunami Relief Cardiff, a charity concert, at the Millennium Stadium in Cardiff, Wales, United Kingdom
WaveAid in Sydney, Australia
IRB Rugby Aid Match, a rugby union match between Northern Hemisphere and Southern Hemisphere selections played on 5 March 2005 at Twickenham in London
Football for Hope, a FIFA-sponsored football (soccer) match played between a World XI and a European XI on 15 February 2005 at Camp Nou, Barcelona.
Classic Response
Village Earth Press documents recovery efforts in Thailand and the U.S. Gulf Coast
A concert by Sting at Leeuwin Estate in Western Australia raised $4 million for the relief efforts.
Tears in Heaven by Tsunami Relief
Tsunami Soccer Aid, a pro-celebrity football match at Anfield organised by Jason McAteer and featuring a team of Liverpool legends.

See also 
2004 Indian Ocean earthquake
Tsunami Evaluation Coalition
Hurricane Andrew
Hurricane Katrina
Humanitarian response to the 2010 Haiti earthquake

References

External links 
United Nations Office of the Special Envoy for Tsunami Recovery
 Forced Migration Review special issue on lessons learned from the humanitarian response
 Reuters Tsunami Aidwatch tracking pledged vs. allocated funds
 ReliefWeb – FTS for South Asia Earthquake & Tsunami financial tracking tables
 BBC News: World helps – but will it forget? 28 December 2004
 Aceh's Media Stages Comeback after Tsunami – IFEX
 Handbags Made By Tsunami Survivors Rebuilding Their Lives One Handbag at a Time

2004 Indian Ocean earthquake and tsunami
2004
Indian Ocean tsunami
2004 in international relations
2005 in international relations